The 2020 Mountain West Conference Championship Game was a college football game played on Saturday, December 19, 2020, at Sam Boyd Stadium in Whitney, Nevada, to determine the 2020 champion of the Mountain West Conference (MWC). The game featured the regular-season champions San Jose State and regular-season runners-up Boise State, and was the conference's eighth championship game.

Due to the COVID-19 pandemic, the game was played behind closed doors without fans.

Teams

Boise State

Boise State entered the championship game with a 5–1 record (5–0 in conference play). Their only loss of the season was to BYU, then ranked ninth in the AP Poll, in early November.

San Jose State

San Jose State entered the championship game with a 6–0 record, all in games played against conference opponents. Their closest game of the season was a 10-point win over Nevada on December 11. This was San Jose State's first appearance in a Mountain West Conference Championship Game.

Game summary

Statistics

See also
List of Mountain West Conference football champions

References

External links
 Game statistics at statbroadcast.com

Championship
Mountain West Conference Football Championship Game
Boise State Broncos football games
San Jose State Spartans football games
Mountain West Conference
Mountain West Conference Football Championship